Capperia washbourni is a moth of the family Pterophoridae. It is found in Greece, Asia Minor, Syria and the Palestinian Territories.

The wingspan is about 18 mm for males and about 15 mm for females.

References

Oxyptilini
Moths described in 1951
Plume moths of Asia
Plume moths of Europe
Taxa named by Stanislaw Adamczewski